Lawrence George "Moose" Stubing (March 31, 1938 – January 19, 2018) was an American professional baseball scout, minor league manager and Major League Baseball third-base coach. Stubing attended high school in White Plains, New York, before signing his first professional contract in 1956.

His playing career consisted of just five pinch-hit at-bats with the California Angels in the 1967 season.  He was a longtime fixture as a minor league player from 1956 to 1969 in the Pittsburgh Pirates, New York/San Francisco Giants, St. Louis Cardinals and Angel organizations before his brief callup in 1967, hitting .283 with 192 home runs in 1,410 games.

He then became a manager in the minor leagues in the Angels' farm system, winning the 1982 Pacific Coast League Manager of the Year Award. In 1984, his Edmonton Trappers became the first Canadian team to win the PCL championship.

Stubing later became a coach with the Angels, and when Cookie Rojas was fired in 1988, he took over as manager and finished out the season, losing the final eight games.

After his coaching career, he scouted for the Angels through . In  he became a member of the professional scouting staff of the Washington Nationals.

Moose Stubing was also a referee in Division 1 college basketball, officiating games in the Pac-10 and other conferences.

Stubing died January 19, 2018.

References

External links
Career statistics, from Baseball Reference

1938 births
2018 deaths
Anaheim Angels scouts
Arkansas Travelers players
Brunswick Pirates players
California Angels coaches
California Angels managers
California Angels players
California Angels scouts
El Paso Sun Kings players
Jacksonville Suns players
Los Angeles Angels of Anaheim scouts
Major League Baseball third base coaches
Rio Grande Valley Giants players
St. Cloud Rox players
Salinas Angels players
Selma Cloverleafs players
Spokane Indians managers
Sportspeople from the Bronx
Baseball players from New York City
Springfield Giants players
Tacoma Giants players
Washington Nationals scouts
Basketball referees in the United States